Andy McDonough (born 11 June 1952) is an Irish rower. He competed in the men's coxless four event at the 1976 Summer Olympics.

References

1952 births
Living people
Irish male rowers
Olympic rowers of Ireland
Rowers at the 1976 Summer Olympics
Place of birth missing (living people)